CTS Eventim is a German company in the leisure-events market, with ticketing and live entertainment, headquartered in Bremen. It is one of the 50 companies comprising the MDAX index, and one of the 40th to 90th largest companies in Germany by market capitalisation.

History

CTS Eventim was founded on November the 4th 1989 in Munich by concert promoters Marcel Avram and Matthias Hoffmann as CTS Computer Ticket Service GmbH and was acquired in 1996 by Klaus-Peter Schulenberg. Klaus-Peter took the company partially public on 1st February 2000 on the Frankfurt stock exchange. That same year the company entered into the live entertainment market with the (partial) acquisitions of several German concert promoters, such as Marek Lieberberg Konzertagentur, Peter Rieger Konzertagentur, Semmel Concerts, Argo Konzerte, FKP Scorpio, and Dirk Becker Entertainment. Over the years CTS Eventim would (partially) acquire several other ticketing and live entertainment companies, notable acquisitions were Austrian promoter Barracuda Music (71% in 2017), Italian based promoters Vertigo (51% in 2017) and Friends & Partners (60% in 2017), Holiday on Ice (50% in 2014 / 100% in 2016), Ticket Online (100% in 2010) and Stage Entertainment's remaining ticketing companies in France, Spain and The Netherlands (100% in 2014).

Together with other sponsors CTS Eventim ensured the long-term continuation of the Kontaktstudiengang Popularmusik at the Hochschule für Musik und Theater Hamburg since 2008, now known as Eventim Popkurz.

In the late 2000's the company started operating several venues, starting with the Waldbühne in Berlin.

The company diversified its ticketing operations in 2015 when it acquired 51% of the German-based Kinoheld, a company that specialises in ticket sales for cinemas. The ownership was raised in 2018 to 100%.

In November 2019, CTS Eventim's revenue exceeded €1 billion for the first time in a nine-month period, and the share price had risen 60% that year to reach a market capitalisation of €5.2 billion.

Eventim France and market leader France Billet merged their French activities in 2019, in the new company Eventim will hold a 48% of the shares with a possibility of raising the ownership in the coming years. The company also merged its Swiss subsidiaries in 2020 with Gadget Entertainment AG and Wepromote Entertainment Group Switzerland AG, taking a 60% share in the new company named Gadget abc Entertainment Group AG.

On February the 21st 2020 it was announced that the company would enter the US market via a new - yet to be named - joint venture based in New York City with promoter Michael Cohl.

In July 2021, CTS Eventim launched Eventim Live Asia. In August 2021, the company announced plans to construct Italy’s largest multipurpose arena, which is due to be completed in fall 2022.

Assets

Ticketing
CTS Eventim (co-)owns several ticketing companies in 21 countries, using various brands.

 Eventim: Germany, Poland, Norway, Sweden, Croatia, Great Britain, Bulgaria, Israel 70%, The Netherlands, Brasil and Slovenia
 Entradas: Spain
 Parter: Russia
 Ticketcorner: Switzerland
 Lippu: Finland
 Billetlugen: Denmark
 TicketOne: Italy 99,7%
 Billet: France 48%
 Oeticket: Austria 86%
 Eventim: Romania 80%
 Eventim: Hungary

Live Entertainment
CTS Eventim holds shares in several live entertainment companies via two subsidiaries.

EVENTIM LIVE GmbH 94,4%
 FKP Scorpio Konzertproducktionen 50,2%
 CRP Konzertagentur 50,2%
 FKP Scorpia
 FKP Poland
 ESK Events 50%
 Friendly Fire
 FKP Scorpio Nordic 90%
 FKP Sweden 51%
 Woah Dad! Live
 FKP Norway 91%
 Fullsteam
 Seinajoki Festivals 65%
 Palazzo
 Holiday On Ice
 Gadget abc Entertainment Group AG 60%
 ABC Production
 Gadget Entertainment
 Eventimpresents
 Vaddi Concerts
 Seekers Event 51,1%
 Promoters Group Munich (25,2% via Eventimpresents, 37,4% via Semmel Concerts Entertainment, 37,4% via ARGO Konzerte)
 Dirk Becker Entertainment 83% (10% via Eventimpresents, 73% via Eventim live GmbH)
 Doctor Music Concerts 63,5%
 In Cow We Trust 60%
 Semmel Concerts Entertainment 50,2%
 Show Factory Entertainment 51%
 Peter Rieger Konzertagentur
 ARGO Konzerte 50,2%
 All Artists Agency 51%
 ALDA Germany 51%
 Act Entertainment 51%
 Vertigo 51%
 Smash!Bang!Pow!

EVENTIM LIVE INTERNATIONAL GmbH 100%
 Friends & Partners 60%
 Vivo Concerti 60%
 Barracuda 71%
 Arcadia Live
 Talent Concert International 51%
 Di&Gi - D'Alesandro e Galli 60%

Venues
CTS Eventim operates several venues across Europe.
 Waldbühne, Berlin, operated since 2009.
 Lanxess Arena, Cologne, operated since 2012.
  Hammersmith Apollo, London (Eventim Apollo), owned since 2013 for 50%.
 K.B. Hallen, Copenhagen, operated since 2019 for 50%.

Notes
1.Eventim, or its subsidiaries, have 100% ownership of the named companies unless noted otherwise.

External links
 Corporate Eventim

References

Companies based in Munich
Online companies of Germany
Companies in the MDAX